Robert W. (Bob) Mattson Jr. (born May 31, 1948) is an American lawyer who held elective political office in Minnesota, and is also involved in various business ventures in Florida, Colorado and Canada. He served one term as Minnesota State Auditor from 1975 to 1979, and was Minnesota State Treasurer from 1983 to 1987. He is a member of the Democratic–Farmer–Labor Party. His father was Minnesota Attorney General Robert W. Mattson Sr.

Mattson was elected State Auditor at the age of 26, the second-youngest to attain statewide office in Minnesota; the distinction of being the youngest goes to Jim Lord, who was 25 when elected State Treasurer.

Mattson was born in Virginia, Minnesota. He is a graduate of Bloomington Kennedy High School in Bloomington, Minnesota, Harvard University in Cambridge, Massachusetts, and William Mitchell College of Law in Saint Paul. His business ventures include Michelbobs Championship Ribs restaurants in Naples, Florida and Cochrane Air Service in Cochrane, Ontario, Canada.

Mattson and his wife, Marge, are the parents of two daughters, Kimberly and Jennifer.  Kimberly operates Kimberly Boutique stores in West Hartford and Guilford, Connecticut, and Jennifer is an attorney in Saint Paul.

References

1948 births
Living people
People from Virginia, Minnesota
State Auditors of Minnesota
State treasurers of Minnesota
Harvard University alumni
William Mitchell College of Law alumni
Minnesota lawyers
American people of Finnish descent
Minnesota Democrats